Korea National League Championship was a football league cup competition operated by the Korea National League.

Champions

List of finals

Titles by club

See also
 Korean National League
 Korean Semi-professional Football Championship

References

External links